Steinmetz/Steynmets is a German surname, meaning 'stonemason'. It may refer to:

People

 Ádám Steinmetz (born 1980), Hungarian water polo player
 Andrew Steinmetz (born 1965), Canadian writer
 Barnabás Steinmetz (born 1975), Hungarian water polo player
 Beny Steinmetz (born 1956), Israeli businessman
 Bill Steinmetz (1899–1988), American speed skater
 Charles Proteus Steinmetz (1865–1923), German-born American electrical engineer and inventor
 Cheri Steinmetz, American politician
 Chris Steinmetz (born 1966), American record producer
 Christian Steinmetz (1882–1963), American basketball player
 David Steinmetz (disambiguation), multiple people
 Donald W. Steinmetz (1924–2013), American judge
 Elliot Steinmetz (born 1980), American basketball coach 
 Francis Steinmetz (1914–2006), Dutch officer
 George Steinmetz (born 1957), American photographer
 George Steinmetz (academic) (born 1957), American sociologist
 Geremias Steinmetz (born 1965), Brazilian archbishop
 Greg Steinmetz (born 1950), American journalist
 Isidora Steinmetz (born 1994), Chilean volleyball player
Jacob Steinmetz (born 2003), American, first Orthodox Jewish player drafted in Major League Baseball
 János Steinmetz (1947–2007), Hungarian water polo player
 Johann Adam Steinmetz (1689–1762), German theologian
 Joseph E. Steinmetz (born 1955), American academic
 Joseph Janney Steinmetz, American photographer
 Jürgen Steinmetz, German guitarist
 Karl Friedrich Franciscus von Steinmetz (1768–1837), Prussian officer
 Karl Friedrich von Steinmetz (1796–1877), Prussian field marshal
 Kim Steinmetz (born 1957), American tennis player
 Klement Steinmetz (1915–2001), Austrian footballer
 Malia Steinmetz (born 1999), New Zealand footballer
 Mark Steinmetz (born 1961), American photographer
 Matt Steinmetz (born 1964), American journalist
 Matthias Steinmetz (born 1966), German astronomer
 Miklós Steinmetz (1913–1944), Hungarian army officer
 Motty Steinmetz (born 1992), Hasidic singer
 Nell S. Steinmetz (1897–??), American librarian
 Paul Steinmetz (born 1977), New Zealand rugby union footballer
 Pierre Steinmetz (born 1943), French judge
 Ralf Steinmetz (born 1956), Chilean-German computer scientist
 Rich Steinmetz (born 1971), American golfer
 Richard Steinmetz (born 1959), American actor
 Selma Steinmetz (1907–1979), Austrian educator
 Sol Steinmetz (1930–2010), Hungarian lexicographer
 Theodore Steinmetz (1880–1951), American musician
 Thérèse Steinmetz (born 1933), Dutch singer
 Werner Steinmetz (born 1950), German gymnast
 William Steinmetz (1847–1903), American soldier
 William G. Steinmetz (1838–1898), German-American architect

Characters
 Tennessee Steinmetz, in The Love Bug
 Grandma Steinmetz, in Herbie Rides Again

Other uses
 1681 Steinmetz (1948 WE), a main-belt asteroid named after German astronomer Julius Steinmetz (1893–1965)
 IEEE Charles Proteus Steinmetz Award
 Pink Star (diamond), formerly known as the Steinmetz Pink Diamond, the largest known Vivid Pink diamond
 Steinmetz, Missouri, a community in the United States
 Steinmetz College Prep, Chicago, Illinois
 Steinmetz Opel Tuning, a German company named after Klaus A. Steinmetz
 Steinmetz solid, in geometry
 Tami Steinmetz Center for Peace Research, an academic research institution of Tel Aviv University

German-language surnames
Jewish surnames
Occupational surnames